
Year 712 (DCCXII) was a leap year starting on Friday (link will display the full calendar) of the Julian calendar. The denomination 712 for this year has been used since the early medieval period, when the Anno Domini calendar era became the prevalent method in Europe for naming years.

Events 
 By place 
 Byzantine Empire 
 The Bulgars under Tervel, ruler (khagan) of the Bulgarian Empire, raid Thrace and reach the city walls of Constantinople. Skirmishes continue until 716; Emperor Philippicus transfers a Byzantine army from the Opsikion Theme in Asia Minor, to police the Balkan Peninsula.

 Europe 
 February – King Ansprand dies, and is succeeded by his son Liutprand as ruler of the Lombards. During his reign, Liutprand becomes the greatest of the Lombard Kings. Coins and documents from his court at Pavia confirm the impression of a strong and effective monarch.

 Arabian Empire 
 Umayyad conquest of Hispania: From North Africa, Musa ibn Nusayr lands in Iberia (Al-Andalus), with an army of 18,000 Arabs and Berbers. He joins the Islamic conquest and captures the city of Seville (Andalusia), where he meets stiff resistance after 3-months of siege.  
 Arab forces under Qutayba ibn Muslim conquer Khwarezm and Samarkand (modern Uzbekistan).

 Asia 
 September 8 – Emperor Rui Zong abdicates after a brief reign, in favor of his 27-year-old son Xuan Zong, who ascends the imperial throne of the Tang Dynasty (China). 
 Xuan Zong reestablishes control over the Oxus and Jaxartes valleys. During his reign he defeats the invading Arab armies, in a series of campaigns in Fergana.
 King Dae Jo-yeong of Balhae (Korea) resumes tributary payments to the Tang Dynasty. The Tai peoples are forced to accept Chinese sovereignty (approximate date).

 By topic 
 Literature  
 The Kojiki (Record of Ancient Times), a history of Japan, is completed.

Births 
 Abdallah ibn Ali, Muslim general (approximate date)
 Du Fu, Chinese poet (d. 770)
 Rupert of Bingen, patron saint (d. 732)

Deaths 
 Ali ibn Husayn, fourth Shia Imam
 Anas ibn Malik, well known sahaba. (b. 611 or 612)
 Ansprand, king of the Lombards
 Aripert II, king of the Lombards (or 711)
 Bran ua Máele Dúin, king of the Uí Ceinnselaig (Ireland)
 Cú Cherca mac Fáeláin, king of Osraige (Ireland)
 Fazang, Chinese Buddhist patriarch (b. 643)
 Idwal Iwrch, king of Gwynedd (Wales)
 Khri ma lod, empress of the Tibetan Empire 
 Vindicianus, bishop of Cambrai (approximate date)

References